Now Dad (also Romanized as Now Dād) is a village in Pol Beh Bala Rural District, Simakan District, Jahrom County, Fars Province, Iran. At the 2006 census, its population was 355, in 73 families.

References 

Populated places in Jahrom County